Events in the year 1863 in Norway.

Incumbents
Monarch: Charles IV

Events
 10 August – The murder of Knut Grøte in Christiania.

Births

January to June
19 February – Axel Thue, mathematician (died 1922)
28 February – Lars Jonson Haukaness, Norwegian American impressionist artist (died 1929)
21 May – Gunnar Berg, painter (died 1893)
23 June – Christian Fredrik Michelet, politician and Minister (died 1927)
26 June – Martin Løken, politician

July to December
15 August – Even Ulving, painter (died 1952).
3 September – Hans Aanrud, author, poet and playwright (died 1953)
30 October – Torger Holtsmark, farmer and politician (died 1926)
18 November – Frederik Macody Lund, historian (died 1943)
20 November – Jonas Schanche Kielland, jurist and politician (died 1925)
24 November – Alfred Larsen, sailor and Olympic gold medallist (died 1950)
28 November – Johan Henrik Rye Holmboe, businessperson, politician and Minister (died 1933)
12 December – Edvard Munch, painter and printmaker (died 1944)
31 December – Christian Albrecht Jakhelln, businessperson and politician (died 1945)

Full date unknown
Adolf Agthe, architect (died 1941)
Sigval Bergesen, ship-owner and politician (died 1956)
Christian Theodor Holtfodt, politician (died 1930)
Nils Riddervold Jensen, politician and Minister (died 1935)
Elias C. Kiær, businessperson (died 1939)
Paul Benjamin Vogt, politician and Minister (died 1947)

Deaths

17 February – Peter Severin Steenstrup, naval officer and businessperson (born 1807)
19 March – Christian Garup Meidell, military officer and politician (born 1780)
25 April – Paul Hansen Birch, military officer (born 1788)
25 May – Peter Andreas Munch,  historian
6 July – Jens Matthias Pram Kaurin, professor of theology, biblical translator, and Lutheran priest (b. 1804).
5 August – Peter Feilberg, newspaper editor and politician (born 1800)
6 August – Jacob Kielland, businessperson, consul and politician (born 1788)
19 September – Hans Christian Heg, colonel and brigade commander in the Union Army during the American Civil War (born 1829)
18 December - Ulrik Frederik Anton de Schouboe, civil servant and politician (born 1782)

Full date unknown
Gunleik Jonsson Helland, Hardanger fiddle maker (born 1828)
Poul Christian Holst, politician and Minister (born 1776)
Jacob Worm Skjelderup, politician and Minister (born 1804)

See also

References